The list of ship launches in 1839 includes a chronological list of some ships launched in 1839.


References

Sources

1839
Ship launches